Alexander von Hartmann (11 December 1890 – 26 January 1943) was a German general in the Wehrmacht during World War II who commanded the 71st Infantry Division.  He was a recipient of the Knight's Cross of the Iron Cross of Nazi Germany. Hartmann was killed on 26 January 1943 during the Battle of Stalingrad and was posthumously promoted to General of the Infantry.

Before his death Hartmann stated, "I intend to go to my infantry in the front line...I will seek death among their ranks.  Captivity for a general is dishonourable."  He was killed instantly when he was shot in the head while standing upright on the railway embankment firing "shot after shot from his rifle."

Awards and decorations

 Knight's Cross of the Iron Cross on 8 October 1942 as Generalleutnant and commander of 71. Infanterie-Division

References

Citations

Bibliography

1890 births
1943 deaths
German Army generals of World War II
Generals of Infantry (Wehrmacht)
German commanders at the Battle of Stalingrad
German Army personnel killed in World War II
Military personnel from Berlin
People from the Province of Brandenburg
Prussian Army personnel
Recipients of the clasp to the Iron Cross, 1st class
Recipients of the Knight's Cross of the Iron Cross
Reichswehr personnel
Deaths by firearm in the Soviet Union
German Army personnel of World War I